Marine cloud brightening also known as marine cloud seeding and marine cloud engineering is a proposed solar radiation management climate engineering technique that would make clouds brighter, reflecting a small fraction of incoming sunlight back into space in order to offset anthropogenic global warming. Along with stratospheric aerosol injection, it is one of the two solar radiation management methods that may most feasibly have a substantial climate impact. The intention is that increasing the Earth's albedo, in combination with greenhouse gas emissions reduction, carbon dioxide removal, and adaptation, would reduce climate change and its risks to people and the environment. If implemented, the cooling effect is expected to be felt rapidly and to be reversible on fairly short time scales. However, technical barriers remain to large-scale marine cloud brightening. There are also risks with such modification of complex climate systems.

Basic principles
Marine cloud brightening is based on phenomena that are currently observed in the climate system. Today, emissions particles mix with clouds in the atmosphere and increase the amount of sunlight they reflect, reducing warming.  This 'cooling' effect is estimated at between 0.5 and 1.5 °C, and is one of the most important unknowns in climate. Marine cloud brightening proposes to generate a similar effect using benign material (e.g. sea salt) delivered to clouds that are most susceptible to these effects (marine stratocumulus).

Most clouds are quite reflective, redirecting incoming solar radiation back into space. Increasing clouds' albedo would increase the portion of incoming solar radiation that is reflected, in turn cooling the planet. Clouds consist of water droplets, and clouds with smaller droplets are more reflective (because of the Twomey effect). Cloud condensation nuclei are necessary for water droplet formation. The central idea underlying marine cloud brightening is to add aerosols to atmospheric locations where clouds form. These would then act as cloud condensation nuclei, increasing the cloud albedo.

The marine environment has a deficit of cloud condensation nuclei due to lower levels of dust and pollution at sea, so marine cloud brightening would be more effective over the ocean than over land. In fact, marine cloud brightening on a small scale already occurs unintentionally due to the aerosols in ships' exhaust, leaving ship tracks. Different cloud regimes are likely to have differing susceptibility to brightening strategies, with marine stratocumulus clouds (low, layered clouds over ocean regions) most sensitive to aerosol changes. These marine stratocumulus clouds are thus typically proposed as the suited target. They are common over the cooler regions of subtropical and midlatitude oceans, where their coverage can exceed 50% in the annual mean.

The leading possible source of additional cloud condensation nuclei is salt from seawater, although there are others.

Even though the importance of aerosols for the formation of clouds is, in general, well understood, many uncertainties remain. In fact, the latest IPCC report considers aerosol-cloud interactions as one of the current major challenges in climate modeling in general. In particular, the number of droplets does not increase proportionally when more aerosols are present and can even decrease. Extrapolating the effects of particles on clouds observed on the microphysical scale to the regional, climatically relevant scale, is not straightforward.

Climatic impacts

Reduction in global warming
The modeling evidence of the global climatic effects of marine cloud brightening remains limited. Current modeling research indicates that marine cloud brightening could substantially cool the planet. One study estimated that it could produce 3.7 W/m2 of globally averaged negative forcing. This would counteract the warming caused by a doubling of the preindustrial atmospheric carbon dioxide concentration, or an estimated 3 degrees Celsius, although models have indicated less capacity. A 2020 study found a substantial increase in cloud reflectivity from shipping in southeast Atlantic basin, suggesting that a regional-scale test of MCB in stratocumulus‐dominated regions could be successful.

The climatic impacts of marine cloud brightening would be rapidly responsive and reversible. If the brightening activity were to change in intensity, or stop altogether, then the clouds' brightness would respond within a few days to weeks, as the cloud condensation nuclei particles precipitate naturally.

Again unlike stratospheric aerosol injection, marine cloud brightening might be able to be used regionally, albeit in a limited manner. Marine stratocumulus clouds are common in particular regions, specifically the eastern Pacific Ocean and the eastern South Atlantic Ocean. A typical finding among simulation studies was a persistent cooling of the Pacific, similar to the “La Niña” phenomenon, and, despite the localized nature of the albedo change, an increase in polar sea ice. Recent studies aim at making simulation findings derived from different models comparable.

Side effects
There is some potential for changes to precipitation patterns and amplitude, although modeling suggests that the changes are likely less than those for stratospheric aerosol injection and considerably smaller than for unabated anthropogenic global warming.

Research 
Marine cloud brightening was originally suggested by John Latham in 1990.

Because clouds remain a major source of uncertainty in climate change, some research projects into cloud reflectivity in the general climate change context have provided insight into marine cloud brightening specifically. For example, one project released smoke behind ships in the Pacific Ocean and monitored the particulates' impact on clouds. Although this was done in order to better understand clouds and climate change, the research has implications for marine cloud brightening.

A research coalition called the Marine Cloud Brightening Project was formed in order to coordinate research activities. Its proposed program includes modeling, field experiments, technology development and policy research to study cloud-aerosol effects and marine cloud brightening. The proposed program currently serves as a model for process-level (environmentally benign) experimental programs in the atmosphere. Formed in 2009 by Kelly Wanser with support from Ken Caldeira, the project is now housed at the University of Washington.  Its co-principals are Robert Wood, Thomas Ackerman, Philip Rasch, Sean Garner (PARC), and Kelly Wanser (Silver Lining). The project is managed by Sarah Doherty.

The shipping industry may have been carrying out an unintentional experiment in marine cloud brightening due to the emissions of ships and causing a global temperature reduction of as much as 0.25 ˚C lower than they would otherwise have been. A 2020 study found a substantial increase in cloud reflectivity from shipping in southeast Atlantic basin, suggesting that a regional-scale test of MCB in stratocumulus‐dominated regions could be successful.

Marine cloud brightening is being examined as a way to shade and cool coral reefs such as the Great Barrier Reef.

Proposed methods 
The leading proposed method for marine cloud brightening is to generate a fine mist of salt from seawater, and to deliver into targeted banks of marine stratocumulus clouds from ships traversing the ocean.  This requires technology that can generate optimally-sized (~100 nm) sea-salt particles and deliver them at sufficient force and scale to penetrate low-lying marine clouds.  The resulting spray mist must then be delivered continuously into target clouds over the ocean.

In the earliest published studies, John Latham and Stephen Salter proposed a fleet of around 1500 unmanned Rotor ships, or Flettner ships, that would spray mist created from seawater into the air.  The vessels would spray sea water droplets at a rate of approximately 50 cubic meters per second over a large portion of Earth's ocean surface. The power for the rotors and the ship could be generated from underwater turbines. Salter and colleagues proposed using active hydro foils with controlled pitch for power.[1]

Subsequent researchers determined that transport efficiency was only relevant for use at scale, and that for research requirements, standard ships could be used for transport. (Some researchers considered aircraft as an option, but concluded that it would be too costly.) Droplet generation and delivery technology is critical to progress, and technology research has been focused on solving this challenging problem.

Other methods were proposed and discounted, including:  

 Using small droplets of seawater into the air through ocean foams. When bubbles in the foams burst, they loft small droplets of seawater.
 Using piezoelectric transducer. This would create faraday waves at a free surface. If the waves are steep enough, droplets of sea water will be thrown from the crests and the resulting salt particles can enter into the clouds. However, a significant amount of energy is required. 
 Electrostatic atomization of seawater drops. This technique would utilize mobile spray platforms that move to adjust to changing weather conditions. These too could be on unmanned ships. 
 Using engine or smoke emissions as a source for CCN.  Paraffin oil particles have also been proposed, though their viability has been discounted.

Costs 
The costs of marine cloud brightening remain largely unknown. One academic paper implied annual costs of approximately 50 to 100 million UK pounds (roughly 75 to 150 million US dollars). A report of the US National Academies suggested roughly five billion US dollars annually for a large deployment program (reducing radiative forcing by 5 W/m2).

Governance
Marine cloud brightening would be governed primarily by international law because it would likely take place outside of countries' territorial waters, and because it would affect the environment of other countries and of the oceans. For the most part, the international law governing solar radiation management in general would apply. For example, according to customary international law, if a country were to conduct or approve a marine cloud brightening activity that would pose significant risk of harm to the environments of other countries or of the oceans, then that country would be obligated to minimize this risk pursuant to a due diligence standard. In this, the country would need to require authorization for the activity (if it were to be conducted by a private actor), perform a prior environmental impact assessment, notify and cooperate with potentially affected countries, inform the public, and develop plans for a possible emergency.

Marine cloud brightening activities would be furthered governed by the international law of sea, and particularly by the United Nations Convention on the Law of the Sea (UNCLOS).  Parties to the UNCLOS are obligated to "protect and preserve the marine environment," including by preventing, reducing, and controlling pollution of the marine environment from any source. The "marine environment" is not defined but is widely interpreted as including the ocean's water, lifeforms, and the air above. "Pollution of the marine environment" is defined in a way that includes global warming and greenhouse gases. The UNCLOS could thus be interpreted as obligating the involved Parties to use methods such as marine cloud brightening if these were found to be effective and environmentally benign. Whether marine cloud brightening itself could be such pollution of the marine environment is unclear. At the same time, in combating pollution, Parties are "not to transfer, directly or indirectly, damage or hazards from one area to another or transform one type of pollution into another." If marine cloud brightening were found to cause damage or hazards, the UNCLOS could prohibit it. If marine cloud brightening activities were to be "marine scientific research"—also an undefined term—then UNCLOS Parties have a right to conduct the research, subject to some qualifications. Like all other ships, those that would conduct marine cloud brightening must bear the flag of the country that has given them permission to do so and to which the ship has a genuine link, even if the ship is unmanned or automated. The flagged state must exercise its jurisdiction over those ships. The legal implications would depend on, among other things, whether the activity were to occur in territorial waters, an exclusive economic zone (EEZ), or the high seas; and whether the activity was scientific research or not. Coastal states would need to approve any marine cloud brightening activities in their territorial waters. In the EEZ, the ship must comply with the coastal state's laws and regulations. It appears that the state conducting marine cloud brightening activities in another state's EEZ would not need the latter's permission, unless the activity were marine scientific research. In that case, the coastal state should grant permission in normal circumstances. States would be generally free to conduct marine cloud brightening activities on the high seas, provided that this is done with "due regard" for other states' interests. There is some legal unclarity regarding unmanned or automated ships.

Advantages and disadvantages 
Marine cloud brightening appears to have most of the advantages and disadvantages of solar radiation management in general. For example, it presently appears to be inexpensive relative to suffering climate change damages and greenhouse gas emissions abatement, fast acting, and reversible in its direct climatic effects. Some advantages and disadvantages are specific to it, relative to other proposed solar radiation management techniques.

Compared with other proposed solar radiation management methods, such as stratospheric aerosols injection, marine cloud brightening may be able to be partially localized in its effects. This could, for example, be used to stabilize the West Antarctic Ice Sheet. Furthermore, marine cloud brightening, as it is currently envisioned, would use only natural substances sea water and wind, instead of introducing human-made substances into the environment.

See also 
 Climate engineering
 Solar radiation management
 Stratospheric sulfate aerosols (geoengineering)
 Cirrus cloud thinning

References

Climate change policy
Planetary engineering
Climate engineering